Kosovo is competed at the 2022 European Championships in Munich, Germany, from 11–21 August 2018. A delegation of 6 athletes represented the country in three sport; athletics, cycling and table tennis.

Competitors
The following is the list of number of competitors in the Championships:

Athletics

Cycling

Road

Men

Table Tennis

Men

Women

Doubles

References

2022
Nations at the 2022 European Championships
European Championships